Peter Cowan may refer to:

 Peter Cowan (cricketer)
 Peter Cowan (writer)
 Peter Ernest Cowan, better known as Ernest Cowan, politician
 Pete Cowen, English golf coach